The Arad Wood House is an historic house in Cranston, Rhode Island.  The -story wood-frame house was built c. 1858 for N. Thornton, and is one Cranston's finest Italianate houses.  Although it was built as a farmhouse, it was acquired in the 1890s by Arad Wood, one of Cranston's wealthiest businessmen, who operated a gentleman's farm of several hundred acres.  The house was also later the first home of the Cranston chapter of the American Red Cross.

The house was listed on the National Register of Historic Places in 1988.

See also
National Register of Historic Places listings in Providence County, Rhode Island

References

Houses completed in 1858
Houses on the National Register of Historic Places in Rhode Island
Houses in Cranston, Rhode Island
National Register of Historic Places in Providence County, Rhode Island
Italianate architecture in Rhode Island